The Patriot Class was a class of 52 express passenger steam locomotives built for the London Midland and Scottish Railway. The first locomotive of the class was built in 1930 and the last in 1934. The class was based on the chassis of the Royal Scot combined with the boiler from Large Claughtons earning them the nickname Baby Scots.  A total of 18 were rebuilt to create the LMS Rebuilt Patriot Class between 1946 and 1948; thereafter those not subjected to rebuilding were often referred to as the Unrebuilt Patriot Class.  These remaining 34 unrebuilt engines were withdrawn between 1960 and 1962.

Overview 
The first two were rebuilt in 1930 from the 1912-built LNWR Large Claughton Class, retaining the original driving wheels with their large bosses, the "double radial" bogie truck and some other parts. Of the subsequent 50 locomotives of the class 40 were nominal rebuilds of Claughtons, being in fact new builds classified as rebuilt engines so that they could be charged to revenue accounts, rather than capital. The last ten were classified as new builds.

The two former Claughtons retained their original numbers until 1934, when they were renumbered 5500–1. The 40 built as replacements took the numbers of the Claughtons that they replaced; these were renumbered 5502–41 in 1934. The remainder of the class were allocated nos. 6030–9, but were numbered 5542–51 from new.  The numbering of the similar LMS Jubilee Class continued on from where the Patriots left off. This was because 5552–5556 were ordered as Patriots (to be numbered 6040–4) but built with taper boilers as Jubilees on the orders of Sir William Stanier.

Naming of the class was somewhat erratic. Some retained old Claughton names, whilst others continued the military associations of the names Patriot and St Dunstans, and 13 carried names of holiday resorts served by the LMS. Seven remained unnamed, although they had been allocated names in 1943.

Many of the 52 members of the Patriot Class spent the bulk of their working careers in England, primarily on the West Coast Main Line. Most of them were stationed at the Crewe North and Carlisle Upperby, though a few were stationed at Edge Hill, Bushbury, Camden, Willesden, Carlisle Kingmoor and other locations in the area. They were primarily used as express engines, but were later tasked with occasional mixed traffic work once the diesel engines arrived on the network.

Rebuilding 

Between 1946 and 1949, eighteen members were rebuilt with Stanier 2A boiler, cab and tender, though again these were largely paper rebuilds, based on the LMS Rebuilt Royal Scot Class.  Seven (Nos 5514/21/6/9-31/40) had been rebuilt by the start of 1948 when British Railways inherited the remaining 45 Baby Scots. In March 1948 BR added 40000 to their numbers to number them 45500–13/15-20/2-5/7/8/32-9/41-51. Subsequently, BR rebuilt another 11, so that the rebuilt engines were (4)5512/14/21–23/25–32/34–36/45.  The two original members of the class, and the first ten of the nominal rebuilds, were not rebuilt due to their non-standard parts.

Details

Note some never received BR numbers as unrebuilt engines because either they were rebuilt by the LMS.  In the table below BR numbers for BR-rebuilt engines are given, but some engines may not have received BR numbers while in an unrebuilt condition as renumbering took several years (sources should indicate these).

Accidents and incidents
On 13 March 1935, a milk train was in a rear-end collision with an express freight train at King's Langley, Hertfordshire due to a signalman's error. No. 5511 was hauling a freight train that collided with the wreckage. A fourth freight train then ran into the wreck. One person was killed.
On 16 October 1939, No. 5544 was hauling a train that was in a collision with another train at Winwick Junction, Cheshire and was derailed.
On 13 October 1940, No. 5529 was hauling an express passenger train that collided with a platform barrow obstructing the line at  station, Middlesex and was derailed. Several people were killed and many more were injured.

Withdrawal

All of the unrebuilt Patriots were withdrawn between 1960 and 1962 in accordance with the BR Modernisation Plan.

New Build  

No Patriot in either rebuilt or unrebuilt form survived into preservation; however, a  replica of no.5551 is under construction. The LMS-Patriot Project, a registered charity, is building a replica which will carry the number of the last built – LMS number 5551 or British Railways number 45551.  It will be named The Unknown Warrior.

Models 

Both Hornby and Bachmann have produced OO gauge models.

Hornby first introduced an original Patriot in the 1979 catalogue that has remained in production and now forms part of the 'Railroad' budget (i.e. toy) range.  The following models have been produced:

Bachmann Industries make a more detailed and expensive model of the original Patriot, also in OO gauge.  The following models have been produced:

References

Bibliography

External links 

 Class PAT Details at Rail UK
 The LMS Patriot Project

6 Patriot
4-6-0 locomotives
Railway locomotives introduced in 1930
Standard gauge steam locomotives of Great Britain
2′C h3 locomotives
Scrapped locomotives
Passenger locomotives